Adrian Voinea (born 6 August 1974) is a former Romanian tennis player who turned professional in 1993.

The right-hander won one singles title (1999, Bournemouth). Voinea was born in Focsani, Romania, but moved to Italy at age 15 to train with his older brother, Marian. His brother played a crucial role in developing his career. He was his tennis coach, mentor, support system, strategist and hitting partner.

Adrian reached his career-high ATP singles ranking of World No. 36 in April 1996. One year before he achieved his greatest success by advancing to the quarterfinals of the 1995 French Open as a qualifier, defeating Karol Kučera, Johan Van Herck, Boris Becker in the third round in four sets, and Andrei Chesnokov. Voinea defeated fifth-seeded Stefan Koubek in the final of the 1999 Brighton International in Bournemouth to win his only singles title at an ATP Tour event.

Between 1995 and 2003 Voinea played in 12 Davis Cup ties for the Romania Davis Cup team and compiled a record of 10 wins and eight losses, all of which were singles matches.

ATP career finals

Singles: 1 (1 title, 1 runner-up)

ATP Challenger and ITF Futures finals

Singles: 7 (4–3)

Doubles: 1 (0–1)

Performance timeline

Singles

References

External links
 
 
 

1974 births
Living people
Romanian male tennis players
Romanian expatriates in Italy
Sportspeople from Focșani
Hopman Cup competitors